Really Old, Like Forty Five is a play by Tamsin Oglesby. The world premiere was at the National Theatre's Cottesloe on 3 February 2010, following previews from 27 January 2010. The production was directed by Anna Mackmin, designed by Lez Brotherston with lighting by Mark Henderson.

Original Cast
Millie - Lucy May Barker
Mike - Paul Bazely
Cathy - Amelia Bullmore
Amanda - Tanya Franks
Robbie - Gawn Grainger
Dylan - Thomas Jordan
Mimi - Michela Meazza
Lyn - Judy Parfitt
Monroe - Paul Ritter
Alice - Marcia Warren

References

British plays
2010 plays